Ao Barik is a village in Afghanistan. It lies roughly 15 miles southwest of Faizabad in Badakhshan Province. There is also a valley of that name in Afghanistan, descending north from the Kaoshan pass.

References

Populated places in Argo District